The 6th Annual Latin Grammy Awards were held in Los Angeles at the Shrine Auditorium on Thursday, November 3, 2005. It was the first ceremony to be broadcast by Univision in the United States. Ivan Lins was the big winner, winning two awards, including Album of the Year. He is the first and only Brazilian and Portuguese-language artist to win Album of the Year to date. Alejandro Sanz was honored with Record of the Year and Song of the Year. Juanes won three awards including Best Rock Solo Vocal Album.

Awards
Winners are in bold text.

General
Record of the Year
Alejandro Sanz — "Tu No Tienes Alma" 
Bebe — "Malo"
Daddy Yankee — "Gasolina"
Reyli — "Amor del Bueno"
Aleks Syntek featuring Ana Torroja — "Duele el Amor"

Album of the Year
Ivan Lins — Cantando Histórias
Bebe — Pafuera Telarañas 
Obie Bermúdez — Todo el Año
Intocable — Diez
Diego Torres — MTV Unplugged 

Song of the Year
Alejandro Sanz — "Tu No Tienes Alma"
Jorge Drexler — "Al otro lado del río"
Aleks Syntek — "Duele el Amor"  (Aleks Syntek featuring Ana Torroja)
Bebe — "Malo"
Obie Bermúdez and Elsten C. Torres — "Todo El Año" (Obie Bermúdez)

Best New Artist
Bebe
Ilona
JD Natasha
Diana Navarro
Reik

Pop
Best Female Pop Vocal Album
Laura Pausini — Escucha
Bebe — Pafuera Telarañas 
Andrea Echeverri — Andrea Echeverri 
Fey — La Fuerza Del Destino
Soraya — El Otro Lado de Mi

Best Male Pop Vocal Album
Obie Bermúdez — Todo el Año
Marc Anthony — Amar Sin Mentiras 
Franco De Vita — Stop
Alejandro Fernández — A Corazón Abierto
Marco Antonio Solís — Razón de Sobra

Best Pop Album by a Duo/Group with Vocals
Bacilos — Sin Vergüenza 
Amaral — Pájaros en la cabeza
Andy & Lucas — Desde mi barrio
Elefante — Elefante 
Presuntos Implicados — Postales

Urban
Best Urban Music Album
Daddy Yankee — Barrio Fino
Don Omar — The Last Don Live 
Luny Tunes — The Kings of the Beats
Orishas — El Kilo
Vico C — Desahogo

Rock
Best Rock Solo Vocal Album
Juanes — Mi Sangre
Enrique Bunbury — El viaje a ninguna parte 
JD Natasha — Imperfecta-Imperfect
Fito Páez — Mi vida con ellas
Revolver — Mestizo

Best Rock Album by a Duo/Group with Vocals
Molotov — Con Todo Respeto
Enanitos Verdes — En Vivo
Jarabe de Palo — 1m² Un Metro Cuadrado
Locos Por Juana — Música Pa'l Pueblo
Volumen Cero — Estelar

Best Alternative Music Album
Ozomatli — Street Signs
Circo — En El Cielo de Tu Boca
Ely Guerra — Sweet & Sour, Hot y Spicy
Los Amigos Invisibles — The Venezuelan Zinga Son, Vol. 1
Los Rabanes — Ecolecua

Best Rock Song
Juanes — "Nada Valgo Sin Tu Amor"
Beto Cuevas — "Bienvenido Al Anochecer" (La Ley)
Martin Chan and JD Natasha — "Lágrimas" (JD Natasha)
Fito Páez — "Polaroid de Ordinaria Locura"
J.L Abreu and Egui Santiago — "Un Accidente" (Circo)

Tropical
Best Salsa Album
Marc Anthony — Valió la Pena 
Oscar D'León — Así Soy... 
El Gran Combo de Puerto Rico — Aquí Estamos y... ¡De Verdad! 
Gilberto Santa Rosa — Auténtico 
Spanish Harlem Orchestra — Across 110th Street

Best Merengue Album
Elvis Crespo — Saboréalo
Los Toros Band — En Vivo 2004
Kinito Méndez — Celebra Conmigo
Ramón Orlando — Generaciones 
Toño Rosario — Resistiré

Best Contemporary Tropical Album
Carlos Vives — El Rock de Mi Pueblo 
Bachá — Bachá 
Juan Formell and Los Van Van — Chapeando
Monchy y Alexandra — Hasta El Fin
Michael Stuart — Sin Miedo 
Various Artists — Cuba Le Canta A Serrat

Best Traditional Tropical Album
Cachao — ¡Ahora Sí! 
Manny Manuel — Nostalgia
Manuel "El Guajiro" Mirabal — Buena Vista Social Club Presents: Manuel Guajiro Mirabal 
Omara Portuondo — Flor De Amor 
Tropicana All Stars — Tradición 

Best Tropical Song
Juan Luis Guerra 440 — "Las Avispas"
Cachao — "Ahora Sí"
José Luis Morín A. and Olga Tañón — "Bandolero" (Olga Tañón)
Carlos I. Medina and Carlos Vives — "Como Tú" (Carlos Vives)
Marc Anthony and Estéfano — "Valió La Pena" (Marc Anthony)

Singer-Songwriter
Best Singer-Songwriter Album
Gian Marco — Resucitar
Djavan — Vaidade
Pedro Guerra — Bolsillos
Kevin Johansen — City Zen
Vicentico — Los Rayos

Regional Mexican
Best Ranchero Album
Luis Miguel — México En La Piel 
Pepe Aguilar — No Soy De Nadie 
Rocío Dúrcal— Alma Ranchera 
Vicente Fernández — Vicente Fernández y Sus Corridos Consentidos
Ana Gabriel — Tradicional

Best Banda Album
Banda El Recodo — En Vivo
Conjunto Atardecer — Los Número Uno del Pasito Duranguense
K-Paz de la Sierra — Pensando En Ti
Los Horóscopos de Durango — Locos de Amor
Lupillo Rivera — Con Mis Propias Manos

Best Grupero Album
Ana Bárbara — Loca de Amar
Oscar De La Rosa and La Mafia — Para El Pueblo 
Grupo Bronco — Sin Riendas
Guardianes del Amor — Olvidarte Nunca
Volumen X — Sigo Pensando En Ti

Best Tejano Album
David Lee Garza, Joel Guzmán and Sunny Sauceda — Polkas, Gritos y Acordeónes 
David Lee Garza & Los Musicales — Solo Contigo 
Jimmy González & El Grupo Mazz — Para Mi Gente
La Tropa F — Milagro 
Bobby Pulido — Vive

Best Norteño Album
Intocable — Diez
Conjunto Primavera — Hoy Como Ayer 
Los Palominos — Atrévete
Los Tigres del Norte — Directo Al Corazón 
Michael Salgado — El Zurdo De Oro 

Best Regional Mexican Song
Josué Contreras and Johnny Lee Rosas — "Aire" (Intocable)
Freddie Martínez, Sr. — "Corazón Dormido" (Jimmy González & El Grupo Mazz)
Edel Ramírez — "Me Vuelvo Loco" (Los Palominos)
Luigi Giraldo, Cruz "CK" Martínez and A.B. Quintanilla — "Na Na Na (Dulce Niña)" (Kumbia Kings)

Instrumental
Best Instrumental Album
David Sánchez — Coral
Manuel Alejandro — Nuevos Caminos
Ed Calle — Ed Calle Plays Santana
Pedro Guzman — Ti ple Jazz
Gonzalo Rubalcaba and New Cuban Quartet — Paseo

Traditional
Best Folk Album
Lila Downs — One Blood Una Sangre 
Camerata Coral and Grupo Tepeu — Misa Criolla - Navidad Nuestra De Ariel Ramírez 
Los Nocheros — Noche Amiga Mía 
John Santos and El Coro Folklórico Kindembo —  Para Ellos
Various Artists — Homenaje A Luis Miranda "El Pico De Oro" 

Best Tango Album
Pablo Ziegler, Quique Sinesi and Walter Castro — Bajo Cero
Hybrid Tango — Hybrid Tango 
Nicolás Ledesma Cuarteto — De Tango Somos 
Adriana Nano — Buenos Aires, Viaje / Buenos Aires, Journey 
Trelles and Cirigliano — Solo Para Dos 

Best Flamenco Album
Tomatito — Aguadulce 
Diego Carrasco — Mi Adn Flamenco 
José Mercé — Confí De Fuá 
Gerardo Núñez with Paolo Fresu, Perico Sambeat and Mariano Díaz — Andando El Tiempo
Niña Pastori — No Hay Quinto Malo

Jazz
Best Latin Jazz Album
Bebo Valdés — Bebo de Cuba - Suite Cubana - El Solar de Bebo - Cuadernos de Nueva York
Paoli Mejias — Mi Tambor
Bob Mintzer, Giovanni Hidalgo, Andy Gonzalez, David Chesky and Randy Brecker — The Body Acoustic
Negroni's Trio — Piano/Drums/Bass
Poncho Sanchez — Poncho at Montreux

Christian
Best Christian Album (Spanish Language)
Juan Luis Guerra 440 — Para Ti
Marco Barrientos — Viento Mas Fuego
Pablo Olivares — Luz En Mi Vida
Rojo — Día de Independencia
Marcos Witt — Tiempo de Navidad

Best Christian Album (Portuguese Language)
Soraya Moraes — Deixa O Teu Rio Me Levar - Ao Vivo 
Aline Barros — Som De Adoradores - Ao Vivo 
Eyshila — Terremoto - Ao Vivo
Ludmila Ferber — Para Orar e Adorar 3 - Ouço Deus Me Chamar
Rose Nascimento — Para O Mundo Ouvir
Oficina G3 — Além do que os Olhos Podem Ver
Alexandre Soul — Cantando, Dançando e Louvando!

Brazilian
Best Brazilian Contemporary Pop Album
Lenine — Incité
Carlinhos Brown — El Milagro de Candeal
Rita Lee — MTV ao Vivo
Tom Zé — Estudando o Pagode

Best Brazilian Rock Album
Charlie Brown Jr. — Tamo Aí na Atividade
Barão Vermelho — Barão Vermelho
Leela — Leela
Tianastácia — Tianastácia ao Vivo

Best Samba/Pagode Album
Martinho da Vila — Brasilatinidade
Jorge Aragão — Ao Vivo 3
Beth Carvalho — A Madrinha Do Samba / Ao Vivo Convida
Wilson das Neves — Brasão de Orfeu
Nei Lopes — Partido ao Cubo
Zeca Pagodinho — À Vera

Best MPB Album
Ivan Lins — Cantando Histórias
Gilberto Gil — Eletracústico
João Gilberto — João Gilberto in Tokyo
Toninho Horta — Com o Pé no Forró
Joyce — Banda Maluca 

Best Romantic Music Album
Roberto Carlos — Pra Sempre ao Vivo no Pacaembu
Raimundo Fagner — Donos do Brasil
Leonardo — Leonardo Canta Grandes Sucessos
Roberta Miranda — Alma Sertaneja
Alexandre Pires — Alto Falante

Best Brazilian Roots/Regional Album
Ivete Sangalo — MTV ao Vivo
Renato Borghetti — Gaitapontocom
Caju & Castanha — Recado a São Paulo
Dominguinhos, Sivuca and Oswaldinho — Cada Um Belisca Um Pouco
Forróçacana — Os Maiores Sucessos de São João
Gil — O Canto da Sereia
Elba Ramalho and Dominguinhos — Baião de Dois

Best Brazilian Song
Lenine and Ivan Santos — "Ninguém Faz Idéia" (Lenine)
Francis Hime and Olivia Hime — "Canção Transparente" (Olivia Hime)
José Miguel Wisnik — "Ponte Aérea" (Eveline Hecker)
Totonho Villeroy — "São Sebastião"

Children's
Best Latin Children's Album
Lina Luna — Lina Luna 
Christell — La Fiesta Continúa!!! 
Floricienta — Floricienta y su banda
Ke Zafados — Ke Zafados
Los Payasónicos — Poder Payasónico
Misión S.O.S — Aventura y Amor

Classical
Best Classical Album
Cuarteto de Cuerdas Buenos Aires and Paquito D'Rivera — Riberas 
Orquestra de Câmara Rio Strings — Fantasia Brasileira
José Serebrier — Glazunov Symphony Nº 5 / The Seasons 
Leo Brouwer — Homo Ludens
Sharon Isbin — Rodrigo Concierto de Aranjuez/Villa Lobos: Concerto For Guitar/Ponce: Concierto Del Sur

Production
Best Engineered Album
Gustavo Borner — MTV Unplugged (Diego Torres)
Chuy Flores and Jack Sáenz III — Diez (Intocable)
Seth Atkins, Javier Garza, Cruz "CK" Martínez and Robert "Bobbo" Gómez III — Fuego (Kumbia Kings)
Robert Carranza, Serban Ghenea and Anton Pukshansky — Street Signs (Ozomatli)
Antonio Cortes — Velvetina (Miguel Bosé)

Producer of the Year
Gustavo Santaolalla
Paco de Lucía
Sergio George
Sebastian Krys
Afo Verde

Music Video
Best Music Video
Juanes — "Volverte a Ver" 
La Ley — "Mírate "
Molotov — "Amateur"
Aleks Syntek — "A Veces Fuí"
Vicentico — "Los Caminos de la Vida"

Special Awards
Lifetime Achievement Awards
 Johnny Pacheco
 Sandro
 Generoso Jiménez
 Sérgio Mendes
 Jorge Ben Jor
 Rocío Dúrcal

Trustees Awards
 Eduardo Magallanes
 Rafael Pérez Botija
 Pierre Cossette

References

Latin Grammy Awards by year
Latin Grammy Awards
Grammy Awards
Annual Latin Grammy Awards
Annual Latin Grammy Awards